Secretary of War was a cabinet office in the United States government from 1789–1947.

Secretary of War may also refer to:
 Confederate States Secretary of War
 Secretary of War (Mexico)
 Secretary of War (Denmark)
 Secretary of State for War

See also
 Secretary at War, British government position